Harvey Reid (born 1954) is an American musician living in York, Maine. He won the 1981 National Fingerpicking Guitar Competition and the 1982 International Autoharp competition. In 1996, Acoustic Guitar magazine listed Harvey's album Steel Drivin' Man as one of the top 10 essential folk albums/CDs of all time. He has 19 records available from Woodpecker Records.

Often referred to as a troubadour or minstrel singer as well as a folk singer, Harvey is considered a master of many musical instruments including the six and twelve string acoustic guitar, slide guitar (dobro), six string banjo, and autoharp.

Reid is married to Joyce Andersen, an accomplished fiddler, guitarist and singer/songwriter who has appeared on several of Harvey's albums/CDs.

Biography 
Reid was born in 1954 in California, and currently resides in southern Maine with his family. He is best known for his solo acoustic fingerstyle guitar work, but he is also a skilled flatpicker and autoharp player who performs and records with dobro, mandolin, mandocello, bouzouki and six-string banjo. Reid is married to New Hampshire-born fiddler/singer/songwriter Joyce Andersen, and they have two children.

He has been a full-time musician since 1976, and has released 25 recordings on the Woodpecker label containing nearly 500 tracks of original, traditional and contemporary acoustic music. Reid won the 1981 National Fingerpicking Guitar competition and the 1982 International Autoharp contest and has performed over 6,000 concerts in most of the 50 states and a number of countries in Europe. Reid also won Bill Monroe's Beanblossom bluegrass guitar contest in 1976. His 1989 CD Solo Guitar Sketchbook, which has remained his best-selling recording, was chosen by Guitar Player Magazine for their Desert Island Top 20 Acoustic Guitar list. In 1992 Reid released another direct-to-digital solo all-traditional recording, Steel Drivin' Man that earned Reid a place in the Acoustic Guitar Magazine Top 10 Folk CD's of All Time list.

He is responsible for quite a number of musical innovations, in addition to his considerable body of recorded and published work. Reid is one of the first artists to start his own record label, and he has successfully run Woodpecker Records since 1982 when he released his first LP of solo acoustic guitar, titled Nothin' but Guitar. After one more LP release in 1983 and 2 cassettes in 1986 and 1987, Reid released in 1988 what many consider to be the first indie CD, titled Of Wind & Water. Reid's DAT recordings from that period were possibly the first releases to be done direct-to-digital master, without any edits or overdubs, and he was among the earliest to embrace the digital revolution in independent music.

All of Reid's recordings feature extensive use of a number of types and nearly two dozen configurations of partial capo, and he is the first modern person to compose, arrange, record and publish guitar music played with this device. Reid self-published a book in May 1980 about it, titled A New Frontier in Guitar, that is also probably the first desktop-published book ever made. It was done with a beta version of Scribe software, a Xerox Alto computer (the predecessor to the Apple Macintosh) and a prototype Diablo laser printer. Also in 1980, Reid co-founded the Third Hand Capo Company with Jefferson Hickey, and has been responsible for spreading the partial capo idea around the acoustic guitar world. He has now written 6 books on the subject, and is actively working at present on a series of instructional works showing how to use this device to expand the capabilities of the guitar. He also combines the partial capo with alternate guitar tunings — e.g. the so-called Liberty Tuning uses the second string raised by a semitone (B → C) plus the partial capo on the 4th fret of the second to fourth or second to fifth strings. In 1984 Reid also co-wrote the first college textbook for folk guitar, Modern Folk Guitar that was published by Random House, which remains in print and in use in university music departments.

Reid is also responsible for the appearance of the Fishman Acoustic Blender amplification system, and has been involved with the evolution of a number of on-stage acoustic guitar amplification tools. He was also the first artist to endorse the Taylor Guitar brand, and has been involved with a number of instrument and equipment manufacturers, helping to design and stage-test gear for modern acoustic musicians. Reid has become a role model for younger musicians who would like to pursue musical careers outside the usual channels of the music industry.

Recordings and books 
 1980 "A New Frontier in Guitar" (book)
 1982 "Nothin' but Guitar" (LP)
 1982 "Duck Soup Guitar" (book)
 1983 "A Very Old Song" (LP)
 1983 "Sleight of Hand" (book)
 1984 "Modern Folk Guitar" (book)
 1984 "The Christmas Project" (cassette)
 1986 "The Coming of Winter (cassette)
 1987 "Heart of the Minstrel on Christmas Day (cassette)
 1988 "Of Wind & Water" (CD)
 1989 "Solo Guitar Sketchbook" (CD)
 1990 "Overview" (CD)
 1992 "Steel Drivin' Man" (CD)
 1994 "Circles" (CD)
 1995 "Artistry of the 6-String Banjo" (CD)
 1996 "In Person" (2-CD)
 1998 "Fruit on the Wine" (CD)
 2000 "Guitar Voyages" (CD)
 2001 "The Great Sad River" (CD)
 2002 "Dreamer or Believer" (2-CD)
 2003 "The Autoharp Album" (CD)
 2004 "Kindling the Fire" (CD)
 2005 "The Christmas Project" (CD)
 2006 "Capo Inventions" (book w/CD)
 2007 "The Song Train" (4-CD/book)
 2009 "Blues & Branches" (CD)
 2009 "The Wreck of the Isidore" (book w/CD)
 2010 "Capo Voodoo: Book 1- The Cut Capo Chord Book" (book)
 2010 "Solo Guitar Project: Vol 1" (digital album)
 2010 "Solo Guitar Project: Vol 2" (digital album)
 2010 "Capo Voodoo: Solo Guitar" (CD)
 2010 "Capo Voodoo: Songs" (CD)
 2011 "Songs from a Long Road" (CD)
 2013 "The Autoharp Waltz" (CD)
 2014 "The Liberty Guitar Album" (CD)
 2014 "The Liberty Guitar Method" (CD)

References

External links 
 Woodpecker Records
 Partialcapo.com

Living people
1954 births
American folk guitarists
American male guitarists
20th-century American guitarists
20th-century American male musicians